Eleanor May Simmonds, OBE (born 11 November 1994) is a British former Paralympian swimmer who competed in S6 events. She came to national attention when she competed in the 2008 Summer Paralympics in Beijing, winning two gold medals for Great Britain. She was the youngest member of the team, at the age of 13. In 2012, she was again selected for the Great Britain squad, this time swimming at a home games in London. She won another two golds in London, including setting a World Record in the 400m freestyle, and a further gold medal at the Rio Paralympics in 2016, this time setting a world record for the 200m medley.

Early and personal life
Born in Walsall, Simmonds grew up in Aldridge, a part of the Metropolitan Walsall Borough. She completed her primary education at Cooper and Jordan CofE Primary before attending Aldridge School and later Olchfa School in Swansea. Simmonds, who has achondroplasia, became interested in swimming at the age of five. She swam for Boldmere Swimming Club in Sutton Coldfield, under Head Coach Ashley Cox, but she and her mother moved to Swansea when Simmonds was 11 to take advantage of the city's world-class swimming pool. Simmonds has three sisters and a brother. She studied Psychology at Loughborough University in England. She is in a relationship with Matt Dean.

Career
At the age of 13, Simmonds was the youngest British athlete at the 2008 Summer Paralympics in Beijing, competing in the 50m, 100m and 400m freestyle, 50m butterfly, and 200m Individual Medley. She won gold medals in the 100m and 400m freestyle events.
 
On 1 September 2012, Simmonds repeated her gold performance to win the 400m freestyle at the 2012 Summer Paralympics in London, in which she took five seconds off the World Record time. Two days later, on the evening of 3 September, she took Gold in the 200m Individual Medley, breaking the World Record that she had set in the qualifying round that morning.

On 12 September 2016, at the Rio Paralympics, Simmonds defended her Gold medal for the 200m individual medley setting a new world record, the first below 3 minutes at 2:59.81 Simmonds also won a bronze medal in the 400m freestyle at the 2016 Summer Paralympics.

In addition, Simmonds has won ten gold World Championship titles, and swims in the S6 disability category.

On 2 September 2021, Simmonds announced her Paralympic retirement after missing out on a medal in the Tokyo 2020 Paralympics.

On 7 August 2022, it was announced that Simmonds would be participating in the twentieth series of the BBC One show Strictly Come Dancing with her professional dance partner being Nikita Kuzmin. She was eliminated in Week 7 after losing the dance off to Molly Rainford and Carlos Gu.

Honours and awards
Simmonds won the 2008 BBC Young Sports Personality of the Year award.

Simmonds was appointed Member of the Order of the British Empire (MBE) in the 2009 New Year Honours. At 14 years old, she became the youngest person ever to have received this honour.  She received the honour from Queen Elizabeth II on 18 February 2009. In March 2012, in the 200 m individual medley, she became the first swimmer to break a world record at London's Aquatics Centre. Her victory in a time of 3:08.14 broke her own previous best time by over half a second.

In 2011, Simmonds won the award for 'Best British Sporting Performance for an Athlete with Disability' at the Jaguar Academy of Sport Annual Awards.
At the 2012 Summer Paralympics in London Simmonds won four medals, two golds, a silver and a bronze. She took gold in the S6 400m with a new world record; gold in the S6 200m again with a new world record; silver in the S6 100m and a bronze in the S6 50m. In celebration of her two gold medals, two Royal Mail postboxes were painted gold in her honour, one in Aldridge and one in Swansea.

Simmonds was elevated to Officer of the Order of the British Empire (OBE) in the 2013 New Year Honours for services to Paralympic sport.

Charity 
Simmonds is very involved with charity work, with much of her focus being on sport, young people and water.

She competed on TV show The Great Celebrity Bake-Off in series 2, episode 2.

Sport 
Simmonds is a patron of the Dwarf Sports Association UK, along with swimmer Matthew Whorwood. Simmonds says of the charity, "It’s a charity that supports people of short stature and helps them get into sport. One of the highlights of the year is the convention we have in the spring. There’s everything from power lifting to athletics."

In January 2019, Simmonds was appointed to the Birmingham 2022 Commonwealth Games Organising Committee board.

Young people 
Simmonds is an ambassador for The Scout Association.

She is also a Girlguiding leader in Manchester, where her pack name is Aqua Owl.

Water 
Simmonds is a WaterAid ambassador.

See also

 Swimming at the 2008 Summer Paralympics
 Swimming at the 2012 Summer Paralympics
 2012 Olympics gold post boxes in the United Kingdom

References

External links
 
 
 
 

Living people
1994 births
Alumni of Loughborough University
British female medley swimmers
Television presenters with disabilities
English female freestyle swimmers
English female swimmers
English people with disabilities
Medalists at the 2008 Summer Paralympics
Medalists at the 2012 Summer Paralympics
Medalists at the 2016 Summer Paralympics
Medalists at the World Para Swimming Championships
Medalists at the World Para Swimming European Championships
Officers of the Order of the British Empire
Paralympic bronze medalists for Great Britain
Paralympic gold medalists for Great Britain
Paralympic medalists in swimming
Paralympic silver medalists for Great Britain
Paralympic swimmers of Great Britain
People educated at Olchfa School
People from Aldridge
S6-classified Paralympic swimmers
Sportspeople from Walsall
Swimmers at the 2008 Summer Paralympics
Swimmers at the 2012 Summer Paralympics
Swimmers at the 2016 Summer Paralympics
Swimmers at the 2020 Summer Paralympics
Swimmers with dwarfism
World record holders in paralympic swimming